Stephen Kyle Holy (born February 23, 1972) is an American country music singer. Signed to Curb Records since 1999, he has released three studio albums: 2000's Blue Moon, 2006's Brand New Girlfriend, and 2011's Love Don't Run. Fifteen of his singles have entered the Billboard Hot Country Songs charts, including the Number One hits "Good Morning Beautiful" (which was featured in the movie Angel Eyes) and "Brand New Girlfriend".

Career

Early life
Steve  was born February 23, 1972, in Dallas, Texas, as the youngest of eight children. He entered a local competition called the Mesquite Opry at age 19. While there, he caught the attention of Wilbur Rimes, the father of country singer LeAnn Rimes. By 1999, Holy was signed to Curb Records.  His musical influences include Elvis Presley, Roy Orbison and Lionel Richie.

1999-2002: Blue Moon
His first single for the label, Don't Make Me Beg, peaked at No. 29 on the Billboard country charts in 2000. By October of that year, Holy's debut album, Blue Moon, was released. Its second and third singles, which were the title track and "The Hunger", respectively, both reached No. 24 on the country charts.

Late in 2001, Holy reached Number One for the first time with "Good Morning Beautiful," a selection from the soundtrack to the film Angel Eyes. This song spent five weeks at Number One on the country charts and reached No. 29 on the Billboard Hot 100. Blue Moon eventually went Gold nine years after its release in February 2009.

2002–2010: Non-album singles and Brand New Girlfriend
Holy released his fifth single, "I'm Not Breakin'," in late 2002. This song peaked at No. 27 on the country music charts. This was followed by four more singles over the next two years: "Rock-a-Bye Heart" at No. 37 in 2003, "Put Your Best Dress On" at No. 26 in 2004, "Go Home" and "It's My Time (Waste It If I Want To)" at No. 49 and No. 59, respectively, in 2005. None of these five singles were included on a studio album.

In 2005, Holy released "Brand New Girlfriend," co-written by Jeffrey Steele, Shane Minor and Bart Allmand. This song became Holy's second Number One on the country charts, reaching the top of the charts in its 36th week and setting a record for the slowest climb to Number One on that chart since the inception of Nielsen SoundScan in 1990. (This record was broken one year later by Tracy Lawrence, whose "Find Out Who Your Friends Are" reached Number One in its forty-first chart week.) "Brand New Girlfriend" was the lead-off single to Holy's second studio album, also entitled Brand New Girlfriend. This album also produced the lesser Top 40 country hits "Come On Rain" and "Men Buy the Drinks (Girls Call the Shots)" at No. 35 and No. 38. Also included on the album were a cover version of Hank Williams, Jr.'s "All for the Love of Sunshine" and a song co-written by United States Senator Orrin Hatch.

A thirteenth single, "Might Have Been", was released in mid-2008 and on the chart week of December 27, 2008, debuted at No. 60 on the Hot Country Songs chart.

2011–present: Love Don't Run
In February 2011 Holy released "Love Don't Run". The song became his first Top 20 hit on the country charts since "Brand New Girlfriend" in 2006. Holy's third studio album, also entitled Love Don't Run, was released on September 13, 2011.  In 2012, Holy released "Radio Up" written by Ben Glover and Bruce Wallace.  In 2013, he parted ways with Curb Records.

Discography

Studio albums

Compilation albums

Singles

A"Blue Moon" did not enter the Hot 100, but peaked at number 20 on Bubbling Under Hot 100 Singles.

Music videos

References

External links
 

1972 births
American country singer-songwriters
American male singer-songwriters
Curb Records artists
Living people
Musicians from Dallas
Singer-songwriters from Texas
21st-century American singers
Country musicians from Texas
21st-century American male singers